Seven Sweethearts is a 1942 musical film directed by Frank Borzage and starring Kathryn Grayson, Marsha Hunt and Van Heflin.

Seven Sweethearts generated legal trouble seven years later. In 1949, Hungarian playwright Ferenc Herczeg sued MGM, producer Joe Pasternak and screenwriters Walter Reisch and Leo Townsend for $200,000, claiming they had plagiarized his play Seven Sisters, which he had written in 1903 and which Paramount Pictures had adapted into The Seven Sisters a 1915 movie starring Madge Evans.

Kathryn Grayson's real-life sister, Frances Raeburn, played "Cornelius."

Plot summary

Mr. Van Maaster (S.Z. Sakall) is a hotelier in Little Delft, Michigan. By family tradition, the oldest of his seven daughters must marry first. But Regina (Marsha Hunt) wants to go to New York, to become an actress. The youngest, Billie (Kathryn Grayson), has the sweetest singing voice, and she ends up marrying Henry Taggart (Van Heflin) while the other sisters including Regina also get married at the same time, so all sisters marry in the same ceremony. 
Although sometimes tagged as a musical, all the songs in the film are diegetic, i.e. there is no unheard accompaniment to the songs, and all with Billie as soloist. They include an English-lyric ("There is a Dreamboat on High") version of a berceuse (Wiegenlied/lullaby), long attributed (and in the film) to Mozart but in fact composed by Friedrich Fleischmann (Schlafe, mein Prinzchen, schlaf ein, 1799) Interestingly, a scene where a pianist-lodger plays a melody intended to lull the father/hotelier to sleep features Rock-a-bye Baby, derived from the often-retexted English ballad Lillibullero, itself derived from the quickstep section of a march by Henry Purcell. At a climactic moment in the tulip festival, she sings the beginning of the aria, "Je suis Titania" (polonaise, from Act II, Scene 2 of the French opera Mignon by Ambroise Thomas, lyrics by Jules Barbier). Other songs featuring Kathryn Grayson as soloist, by the songwriting team of Walter Jurmann (music) and Paul Francis Webster (lyrics), include "You and the Waltz and I", "Little Tingle Tangle Toes", and "Tulip Time".

Cast

 Kathryn Grayson as Billie Van Maaster
 Marsha Hunt as Regina 'Reggie' Van Maaster
 Cecilia Parker as Victor Van Maaster
 Peggy Moran as Albert 'Al' Van Maaster
 Dorothy Morris as Peter Van Maaster
 Frances Rafferty as George Van Maaster
 Frances Raeburn as Cornelius Van Maaster
 Van Heflin as Henry Taggart
 Carl Esmond as Carl Randall
 Michael Butler as Bernard Groton, Peter's Beau
 Cliff Danielson as Martin Leyden, Victor's Beau
 William Roberts as Anthony Vreeland, Cornelius's Beau
 James Warren as Theodore Vaney, Albert's Beau
 Dick Simmons as Paul Brandt, George's Beau
 S. Z. Sakall as Mr. Van Maaster, the Father
 Diana Lewis as Mrs. Nugent
 Lewis Howard 	as Mr. Nugent
 Donald Meek as Reverend Howgan
 Louise Beavers as Petunia

Reception
According to MGM records the film made $638,000 in the US and Canada and $1,048,000 elsewhere (a rarity for MGM, as most movies earned more money domestically until after WWII); this gave the studio a profit of $364,000.

References

External links 
 
 
 
 

1942 films
American black-and-white films
1940s romantic musical films
American romantic musical films
Films scored by Franz Waxman
American films based on plays
Films based on works by Ferenc Herczeg
Films directed by Frank Borzage
Metro-Goldwyn-Mayer films
Films produced by Frank Borzage
Films produced by Joe Pasternak
1940s English-language films
1940s American films